Homer M. "Buddy" DeLoach (born February 27, 1942) is an American politician. He was a member of the Georgia House of Representatives from 1995 to 2005, and is a current member since 2021. He is a member of the Republican Party.

References

Living people
Republican Party members of the Georgia House of Representatives
1942 births
People from Liberty County, Georgia
21st-century American politicians